The 2021–22 LEB Oro season was the 26th season of the Spanish basketball second league. It started on 8 October 2021 with the first round of the regular season and ended on 19 June 2022 with the Final Four.

Format changes
For this season, the league was back to 18 teams and brought back the single group with a single group phase in which the top team of the regular season promoted directly to Liga ACB. At the same time, the teams placed between 2nd and 9th qualified for the playoffs to decide the second promotion to Liga ACB and the last three teams were relegated to LEB Plata. For the playoffs, the quarter-finals were played in a best-of-five series and the semi-finals and the final were played in a single-game format in a neutral venue.

Teams

Promotion and relegation (pre-season)
A total of 18 teams contested the league, including 14 sides from the 2020–21 season, two relegated from the 2020–21 ACB and two promoted from the 2020–21 LEB Plata. On July 5, 2021, Real Murcia resigned to play in the league due to lack of financial support.

Teams relegated from Liga ACB
Movistar Estudiantes
Acunsa Gipuzkoa

Teams promoted from LEB Plata
Juaristi ISB
Barça B (swapped places with ICG Força Lleida which avoided relegation to LEB Plata)
CB Prat

Venues and locations

Personnel and sponsorship

Managerial changes

Regular season

League table

Positions by round
The table lists the positions of teams after completion of each round. In order to preserve chronological evolvements, any postponed matches are not included in the round at which they are originally scheduled, but added to the full round they are played immediately afterwards.

Results

Playoffs

Source: FEB

Copa Princesa de Asturias
The Copa Princesa de Asturias was played by the two first qualified teams after the end of the first half of the season (round 17). The cup was scheduled originally on 11–12 February 2022 and was postponed to 3 April 2022 with the aim to extend the term for the dispute of the games postponed from first half of the season in response to the COVID-19 pandemic. The champion of the cup played the playoffs against the ninth qualified as it finished the league between the second and the fifth qualified.

Teams qualified

Game

Final standings

Awards
All official awards of the 2021–22 LEB Oro season.

Final Four MVP

Source:

Copa Princesa de Asturias MVP

Source:

Player of the round

Regular season

Quarter-finals

References

External links
 Official website 

LEB
LEB Oro seasons
Second level Spanish basketball league seasons
2021–22 in European second tier basketball leagues